SS Thomas L. Haley was a Liberty ship built in the United States during World War II.

Construction
Thomas L. Haley was laid down on 8 January 1945, under a Maritime Commission (MARCOM) contract, MC hull 2518, by the St. Johns River Shipbuilding Company, Jacksonville, Florida; she was sponsored by Mrs. Stanley Erwin, the wife of a prominent Jacksonville physician, and she was launched on 12 February 1945.

History
She was transferred to Greece, under the Lend-Lease program, on 24 February 1945. She was sold for commercial use, 17 January 1947, to Stavros S. Niarchos, for $576,758.66.

References

Bibliography

 
 
 
 
 

 

Liberty ships
Ships built in Jacksonville, Florida
1945 ships
Liberty ships transferred to Greece